Emeishan may refer to:

Mount Emei, mountain in Sichuan, China
Emeishan (city), in Leshan, Sichuan, China
Emeishan Traps, flood basalt volcanic province in southwestern China, centered in Sichuan